Loin de moi is Dalida's ninth album. This album represents Dalida's slow shift from her exotica style to a more pop-rock genre. This album, not as successful as the previous, contains hits like "Avec une poignée de terre" and "Nuits d'Espagne".

Track listing 
Barclay – 80 165,

See also 
 Dalida albums discography

References

Sources 

Dalida albums
1961 albums
French-language albums
Barclay (record label) albums